Mohamed Magdy Mohamed Morsy (born 6 March 1996), known by his nickname Afsha, is an Egyptian footballer who plays for Egyptian Premier League side Al Ahly as an attacking midfielder.

Club career
Afsha started his career at ENPPI and Pyramids, before joining Al Ahly in 2019. In the 2020 CAF Champions League Final, he scored the winning goal for Al Ahly in a 2–1 victory over their rivals Zamalek. He also netted in a 3–0 win over Kaizer Chiefs in the 2021 CAF Champions League Final.

On 4 February 2023, Afsha scored the only goal in a 1–0 victory over Seattle Sounders in the 2022 FIFA Club World Cup second round, sending Al-Ahly to the semi-finals.

Career statistics
Last updated on 19 September 2022

 With clubs 

International goalsScores and results list Egypt's goal tally first, score column indicates score after each Afsha goal''.

Honours and achievements
Al Ahly
 Egyptian Premier League: 2019–20
 Egypt Cup: 2019–20
 Egyptian Super Cup: 2018–19, 2021
 CAF Champions League: 2019–20, 2020–21
 CAF Super Cup: 2021 (May), 2021 (December)
 FIFA Club World Cup: Third-Place 2020, Third-Place 2021

Individual

Awards 
 Best Player In 2020 CAF Champions League Final
 Best Player In 2021 CAF Champions League Final

References

External links

1996 births
Living people
People from Giza
Egyptian footballers
Egypt international footballers
Egypt youth international footballers
Association football midfielders
Egyptian Premier League players
ENPPI SC players
El Raja SC players
Pyramids FC players